The Church of All Saints, formerly The Church of St. Michael, is a medieval building and an active Anglican parish church in Houghton Regis in the English county of Bedfordshire. It is a 13th century Grade I listed building.

History
The Parish of Houghton Regis refers to the building as a "picturesque 13th century church" with "worship in a lively Catholic Eucharistic tradition. The religious use of the site predates the present building and is claimed to go back one thousand years to Saxon times. The church's website records that the church stands in the 'old villge,' in Houghton Regis. All Saints is one of the few churches in Bedfordshire which is mentioned in the Doomsday Book, which states William the Chamberlain held the church, along with that at Luton. Henry I subsequently held it before passing Houghton Regis to his illegitimate son, Robert Earl of Gloucester. His son, William, granted the church to St Albans Abbey in 1153.

Domesday also recorded the church's finances. Its financial endowment, half a hide, was valued at 12s. In 1291 the church's value was recorded at £16 13s. 4d.  Upon the Dissolution of the monasteries  the vicarage was listed as £11 13s. 4d. (fn. 123) and the rectory at £41. The church holds six registers antedating 1813: "(1) all entries 1538 to 1678; (2) the same 1704 to 1767, marriages to 1754; (3) marriages 1754 to 1795; (4) baptisms and burials 1768 to 1807; (5) marriages 1795 to 1807; (6) marriages 1807 to 1812." At one time, All Saints was called the Church of St. Michael; at that time there was an "iron mission" associated with it on Union Street in Upper Houghton.

The actor Gary Cooper and his brother Arthur were baptized and confirmed at All Saints on 3 December 1911.

The parish is a traditional Anglican Church. Until recently it was within the care of the bishop of Richborough, one of three flying bishops” but, as of March 2022, is looking to recruit its own priest. Currently, the church's website notes that it is "a friendly and welcoming Christian community in the Catholic tradition of the Church of England."

On the church grounds there is also a cemetery which is now deemed fully occupied. In 2011, the Mayor, Robin Hines, unveiled a new Town Sign for Houghton Regis. It was financed by specific grant funding and was intended to “add a sense of place and community to the town.”  The sign and crest feature historic and more modern elements including All Saints Church and its stained glass window.”

Design 

Located on High Street, "[t]he church is on the main road (A5120) through Houghton Regis from the A5 to the M1 and beyond."  Park next door in the shopping centre.

Charles O'Brien and Nikolaus Pevsner, in the 2014 revised edition of Bedfordshire, Huntingdonshire and Peterborough in the Pevsner Buildings of England series, describe All Saints as "a stately church". The style of the building is mainly Decorated Gothic. It consists of a chancel, cloistered nave of five bays, aisles, and a south porch. An embattled western tower with an octagonal battlemented turret at the south-west angle contains six bells.  The chancel is Decorated style, and the nave arcades belong to the same period. The clerestory and roof are Perpendicular Gothic. Both nave and aisles are embattled. The Norman font is cylindrical, widening towards the top, and the whole exterior is richly carved in three bands, the lowermost being fluted.  The base is cushioned, with cable moulding.

There are brasses to previous vicars, and several memorial slabs. The register dates from the year 1538. A tomb with the effigy of a knight, with a guardian lion at his feet, is on the south aisle wall.  This likely depicts John de Sewell who accompanied the Black Prince to Aquitaine in the retinue of Hugh, Earl of Stafford during the Black Prince's chevauchée of 1356.   Only the figure's head and torso remain, along with the lion protecting the missing feet.  The tomb is "in need of some repair. Under the tomb are carvings representing a chevron between three bees  the Sewell Arms.

In front of the tomb is a "fine circular Norman [baptismal] font of Totternhoe stone." Antedating the construction of the present church, the "Norman font is the oldest known part of the church... The font is one of a number of fonts known collectively as the 'Aylesbury Group' after a particularly fine example in the parish church at Aylesbury."  These fonts are normally dated late in the 12th Century around the years 1170 to 1190.  The vicinity of the Sewell tomb, the Lady Chapel and the tower contain good examples of Victorian stained glass.  These includes windows of the Risen Christ, the Resurrection, the Baptism of the Lord, and the Institution of the Eucharist (i.e., the Last Supper). Three of the windows are by Thomas Baillie, dating from 1864.

The building materials are flint and Totternhoe stone, a relatively hard chalk from the Chiltern Hills. The church is a Grade I listed building.

There are six bells, specifically: the treble (John Briant, Hertford, 1815); Second (John Briant, 1816); Third (Newcombe, 1616, recast 1899 by Taylor); Fourth (John Briant, Hertford, 1811); Fifth (John Dier, 1580, recast 1899 by Taylor); and the tenor (Anthony Chandler, 1673).  The electroplate plate is modern.

The church's pipe organ is a two manual and pedal instrument. It was built in 1880 by C. M. Walker of London; enhanced in 1914 by Nicholson and Lord of Walsall; refurbished and modernized in 1992, when Kenneth Breedon provided "several additional stops" including a full-length Conacher trumpet, and cleaned and refurbished in 2021.  The organ is regularly cleaned and serviced.

Gallery

See also
Grade I listed buildings in Bedfordshire

References

Notes

Citations

Bibliography
 This article includes text incorporated from E.R. Kelly's (1885) "Kelly's directory of Bedfordshire, Hunts and Northamptonshire.", p. 66, a publication now in the public domain.

Further reading
Buckingham. Francis W. (1937) Church of All Saints Houghton Regis: A Brief Descriptive and Historical Account

External links

 Official website
 Houghton Regis Bedfordshire Family History Guide 27 March 2022.

Houghton Regis
Diocese of St Albans
Grade I listed churches in Bedfordshire